The pale-eyed pygmy tyrant (Atalotriccus pilaris) is a species of bird in the tyrant flycatcher family, Tyrannidae, where it makes up the monotypic genus Atalotriccus.

It is found in Brazil, Colombia, Guyana, Panama, and Venezuela. Its natural habitats are subtropical or tropical dry forest and subtropical or tropical moist lowland forest.

References

pale-eyed pygmy tyrant
Birds of Panama
Birds of Colombia
Birds of Venezuela
pale-eyed pygmy tyrant
Taxonomy articles created by Polbot